James Copland (3 February 1834 – 9 November 1902) was a New Zealand presbyterian minister, doctor and writer. He was born in Edinburgh, Midlothian, Scotland on 3 February 1834 and emigrated to New Zealand in 1864. He was active as a minister in Lawrence and then in North Dunedin, because he resigned from the ministry. He then practised again as a doctor and moved to Gore, where he died on 9 November 1902.

It is believed that the surveyor George John Roberts named the Copland River on the West Coast of New Zealand for Copland, with the name later adopted for an alpine pass and a glacier.

References

1834 births
1902 deaths
19th-century New Zealand medical doctors
Scottish emigrants to New Zealand
New Zealand writers
New Zealand Presbyterians